Avitortor is an extinct, fossil genus of hide beetle that lived during the Lower Cretaceous. Avitortor is the only genus of the subfamily Avitortorinae.

Species 

Avitortor dolichodactylus Nikolajev 2007 Dzun-Bain Formation, Mongolia, Aptian
Avitortor leptoscelis Nikritin 1977 Zaza Formation, Russia, Aptian
Avitortor ovalis Nikolajev 2007 Zaza Formation, Russia, Aptian
Avitortor parallelus Nikolajev 2007 Dzun-Bain Formation, Mongolia, Aptian
Avitortor primitivus Ponomarenko, 1977

References

Trogidae
Fossil taxa described in 1977